Aqa Mohammad Beyglu (also Romanized as Āqā Moḩammad Beyglū) is a village in Darrehrud-e Shomali Rural District of Darrehrud District of Ungut County, Ardabil province, Iran. Prior to the formation of the county, the village and rural district were in Angut District of Germi County. At the 2006 census, its population was 764 in 157 households. The following census in 2011 counted 803 people in 182 households. The latest census in 2016 showed a population of 681 people in 197 households; it is the center of its rural district.

References 

Populated places in Ardabil Province